Clore is a surname. Notable people with the surname include:

Charles Clore (1904–1979), British financier, retail and property magnate and philanthropist
G. Marius Clore (born 1955), British/American molecular biophysicist
Joanna Clore, character in the British sitcom Green Wing, played by Pippa Haywood
Walter Clore (1911–2003), pioneer in wine growing and agricultural research in Washington State

See also
Clore Gallery at the Tate Britain art gallery in London, which houses work by J. M. W. Turner
Clore Garden at the Weizmann Institute of Science, a university and research institute in Rehovot, Israel
Charles Clore Park, beachfront public park in southwestern Tel Aviv, Israel
Clore Leadership Programme, British programme of professional training and personal development
Clore Tikva Primary School, Jewish voluntary aided primary school in Barkingside, London, England
Claw
Clor